Cockenzie and Port Seton (meaning "cove of Kenneth") is a unified town in East Lothian, Scotland. It is on the coast of the Firth of Forth, four miles east of Musselburgh.  The burgh of Cockenzie was created in 1591 by James VI of Scotland. Port Seton harbour was built by George Seton, 11th Lord Seton between 1655 and 1665.

The town had a population of 4,493 in 2001. Since the last census in 2001, many new houses have been built. Cockenzie and Port Seton has continued to grow over the years and is now a dormitory town for Scotland's capital city, Edinburgh.

Power station
To the west of the town, between Cockenzie and Prestonpans is the site of Cockenzie power station, a large coal-fired power station which was a major employer from the 1960s until it closed in 2013, and enabled the town to survive and prosper. Demolition of the main plant is now complete and ownership transferred to East Lothian Council who are now looking for businesses to occupy the site. Plans for an Energy Park on the site, to be used for the construction and repair of wind turbines, were scrapped in March 2015.

Fishing

Cockenzie and Port Seton has grown from what were initially two small fishing villages. The older parts of the town, between the two harbours, retain a more traditional look and feel, similar to many other small fishing villages on the east coast of Scotland. Although the fishing industry has declined in recent years the harbour at Port Seton still retains a small fleet of vessels, mainly fishing for prawns. In the past, Cockenzie was also involved in the salt making and coal mining industries.

Tourism
To the east of Port Seton there is a large caravan campsite/holiday park at Seton Sands. The promenade area and the creation of a coastal walk, a part of the John Muir Way, have improved the environment in recent years.

To the south east is Seton Collegiate Church, a collegiate church also known as Seton Chapel, an Ancient Monument in the care of Historic Scotland. Next to it was Seton Palace, now Seton Castle.

Transport
Cockenzie and Port Seton are served by direct bus links to and from Edinburgh, Prestonpans and Musselburgh. These services are operated by Lothian Buses (routes 26, N26 and X26). The nearest railway station is at Prestonpans.

Churches

Cockenzie and Port Seton have several churches of different denominations, including:
Chalmers Memorial Church (Church of Scotland)
Old Parish Church (Church of Scotland)
Methodist Church
Two Gospel halls

Leisure
In 2005, The 3 Harbours Arts Festival was inaugurated by Cockenzie, Port Seton and Prestonpans. It takes place in early June.

In 2006, Cockenzie and Port Seton along with the neighbouring towns of Prestonpans and Longniddry were twinned with the town of Barga, Tuscany, Italy.

The town has a community centre with activities such as a youth club, football pitches and a skatepark within the grounds.

Notable people
John Dalgleish Donaldson, professor and the father of Mary, Crown Princess of Denmark was born there in 1941
John Bellany, artist, was born in Port Seton in 1942
Robert Cadell, Sir Walter Scott's publisher, lived in Cockenzie
Thomas Cadell, recipient of the Victoria Cross

See also
Preston Lodge High School
Tranent to Cockenzie Waggonway
List of places in East Lothian
List of places in Scotland

References
Citations

Sources

External links

Cockenzie and Port Seton Local History Society

Towns in East Lothian
Fishing communities in Scotland